Kinsale Historic District is a national historic district located at Kinsale, Westmoreland County, Virginia. The district encompasses 65 contributing buildings in the historic core of the village of Kinsale. The district includes primarily residential and commercial buildings dating from the late-19th to early-20th centuries.  Notable resources include the Bailey Cemetery, the Great House (c. 1827) and Little House (c. 1840), Plain View (c. 1872), Captain Charles Courtney House (c. 1880s), former Bank of Kinsale, former Palmer and Moore Kinsale Motor Corporation (c. 1918), Cople District Volunteer Fire Hall Department Building, Kinsale Foundation and Museum, and Kinsale Harbour Yacht Club.

It was listed on the National Register of Historic Places in 2005.

References

Historic districts on the National Register of Historic Places in Virginia
Buildings and structures in Westmoreland County, Virginia
National Register of Historic Places in Westmoreland County, Virginia